Adolf Insam (born 4 August 1951) is an Italian ice hockey player. He competed in the men's tournament at the 1984 Winter Olympics.

References

External links
 

1951 births
Living people
Olympic ice hockey players of Italy
Ice hockey players at the 1984 Winter Olympics
People from Sëlva
Sportspeople from Südtirol